Un mondo perfetto is the second studio album by Italian singer Dolcenera, released on May 18, 
2005 via Amarena Music/BMG Ricordi. It peaked at #4 on the Italian album chart and spawned three 
singles "Mai più noi due", "Continua" and "Passo dopo passo".

Track listing

Un mondo perfetto (Germany, Austria and Switzerland)
On 29 August 2006, a new version of the album was released in Germany, Austria and Switzerland. The new edition includes songs from the Italian albums Un mondo perfetto and Il popolo dei sogni. The last track of the album is a new version of Dolcenera's first top-ten single, "Siamo tutti là fuori", included in her debut album Sorriso nucleare.

Charts
Album 

The album sold nearly 150.000 copies.

Singles

References

2005 albums
Dolcenera albums
Italian-language albums